The following are the national records in Olympic weightlifting in Israel. Records are maintained in each weight class for the snatch lift, clean and jerk lift, and the total for both lifts by the Israel Weightlifting Federation (איגוד הרמת משקולות בישראל).

Current records
Key to tables:

Men

Women

Historical records

Men (1998–2018)

Women (1998–2018)

References
General
Israeli records – Men 11 April 2021 updated
Israeli records – Women 13 December 2022 updated
Specific

External links
 Israel Weightlifting Federation website

records
Israel
Olympic weightlifting
weightlifting